The Best of Marillion is a compilation album from the band Marillion. The songs come from both the Fish era and Steve Hogarth era of the band. It was released in mainland Europe only.

It contains no previously unreleased material.

Track listing

 "Garden Party" (Edited Version) - 4:34
 "Assassing" (7" Version) - 3:38
 "Kayleigh" (Single Version) - 3:36
 "Lavender" - 3:43
 "Heart of Lothian" - 3:37
 "Incommunicado" - 3:58
 "Sugar Mice" (Radio Edit) - 5:01
 "Warm Wet Circles" - 4:24
 "Hooks in You" - 2:56
 "Easter" (7" Edit) - 4:31
 "Cover My Eyes"* (Pain & Heaven) - 3:54
 "No One Can"* - 4:42
 "Dry Land" (7" Edit) - 4:04
 "Sympathy"* - 3:27
 "Alone Again in the Lap of Luxury" (Radio Edit) - 4:28
 "Beautiful" (Radio Edit) - 4:24
 "Man of a Thousand Faces" - 3:36
 "Between You and Me" (Mark Kelly Remix) - 4:13

All are single edits unless indicated with * which are album versions.

Personnel
Fish - vocals on tracks 1-8
Steve Hogarth – vocals on tracks 9-18
Steve Rothery - guitars
Mark Kelly - keyboards
Pete Trewavas - bass
Mick Pointer - drums on track 1
Ian Mosley - drums on tracks 2-18

References 

Darren Newitt - Cover Concept and Design, including original artwork references by Carl Glover and Mark Wilkinson

2003 greatest hits albums
Marillion compilation albums